In the 1969 Intertoto Cup no knock-out rounds were contested, and therefore no winner was declared. Jednota Trenčín were the best performers, with 11 points.

Group stage
The teams were divided into nine groups of four teams each.

Group 1

Group 2

Group 3

SpVgg Fürth was declared winner of the group

Group 4

Group 5

Group 6

Group 7

Group 8

Group 9

See also
 1969–70 European Cup
 1969–70 UEFA Cup Winners' Cup
 1969–70 Inter-Cities Fairs Cup

External links
  by Pawel Mogielnicki

1969
4